Brian Hardgroove is a producer and bass player (on hiatus) for the legendary hip-hop group Public Enemy. He has also toured with Bootsy Collins and T.M. Stevens in a three-bass player tour.

Career 
Hardgroove works as a producer and educator. As of 2015, he is the resident artist at Santa Fe University of Art and Design, where he helped start the Artists for Positive Social Change program. As a music producer, Hardgroove cites Eddie Kramer (Jimi Hendrix, Led Zeppelin, Kiss) and Jack Douglas (Aerosmith, John Lennon, Cheap Trick) as two of his closest and most trusted advisers in the music business. He worked as a producer for Demerit and Brain Failure. He is also the founder of From a Whisper to a Dream, a program that helps young musicians obtain endorsements from manufacturers of musical equipment.

His most recent project is "Audio Rhythm Theory" with Police drummer Stewart Copeland, along with King's X bassist/vocalist Dug Pinnick. Hardgroove is also currently in production with Fred Schneider (The B52s) completing the debut album for GOOD THANG. Schneider and Hardgroove compose all the songs together. Hardgroove plays all the instruments while Schneider provides his classic vocals stylings.

Personal Life 
He grew up in Hollis, Queens, but relocated to Santa Fe, New Mexico in 2006. He cites the reason for relocation as wanting his daughter to get in touch with her roots.

References

External links
Brian Hardgroove Interview NAMM Oral History Library (2017)

American bass guitarists
Public Enemy (band) members
Living people
Year of birth missing (living people)
People from Hollis, Queens